This is a list of the number-one hits of 1966 on Italian Hit Parade Singles Chart.

See also
1966 in music
List of number-one hits in Italy

References

1966 in Italian music
1966 record charts
1966